Jahanabad Assembly constituency is one of the 403 assembly constituencies of Uttar Pradesh, India. It is part of Fatehpur district.
It contains these parts of Fatehpur district-
Amauli, Tappajar, Paprenda, Jahanabad, Khajuha & Kora Jahanabad (NP) of Bindki Tehsil. In 1952, the first Member of Legislative Assembly / MLA / Vidhayak for Jahanabad constituency Guru Prashad Pandey contested election with the support of Swargiya Satyapal Gupta (Lambardar) and all expenses of election were picked up by him.

In 1962-67 during the third legislative assembly of Uttar Pradesh Sri Ram Kishore Verma became Independent M.L.A. by defeating Shabbir Hasan from Tappajar Constituency (Jahanabad). district Fatehpur. His election symbol was the SCALES (Taraju).   

Father-Sri Nainsukh, Mother-Tulshi Devi, Born in 1923 at village asadhna,P.O. Rar District-Kanpur. Married Shyama Devi in 1941. The wife died, one son Ram Gopal Verma and one daughter Rampyari. Has been general secretary of tehshil congress committee, Ghatampur (kanpur); Sarpanch of Nyaya panchayat and has been associated with educational institutions. Is manager of Adarsh Natak Samaj, Asadhna. Interest in Dramaturgy. People remember him 'JANPRIYA' leader Ram Kishor Verm"a MANTRI"JI.

Data has been collected from Who's who of P. LEGISLATIVE ASSEMBLY BOOK 1962 -67.

Members of Legislative Assembly

Election results

2022

2017

References
http://m.livehindustan.com/uttar-pradesh-election/constituency-jahanabad-constituency-2012

http://myneta.info/up2012/index.php?action=show_candidates&constituency_id=238

External links
 

Assembly constituencies of Uttar Pradesh
Fatehpur district